Malethu Sarala Devi (born October 1943) is an Indian National Congress leader who represented the Aranmula (State Assembly constituency) in the Kerala Legislative Assembly in 2001.

References 

1943 births
Living people
Indian National Congress politicians from Kerala
Kerala MLAs 2001–2006
21st-century Indian women politicians
Women members of the Kerala Legislative Assembly